Melmoth may refer to:

Garrison Melmoth, a homebuilt aircraft designed by Peter Garrison
Garrison Melmoth 2, a follow-up design to the Garrison Melmoth
Melmoth (comics), a graphic novel by Dave Sim featuring Cerebus the Aardvark
Melmoth the Wanderer, a gothic novel written by Charles Robert Maturin
Melmoth, a novel written by Sarah Perry
Melmoth the Wanderer is the name of Humbert Humbert's car in Vladimir Nabokov's Lolita
Sebastian Melmoth, a pseudonym used later in life by writer Oscar Wilde
Melmoth, KwaZulu-Natal, a small town in Zululand, South Africa
William Melmoth, English devotional writer and lawyer